Walk with Me is a 2016 Danish drama film directed by Lisa Ohlin. It was named as one of three films that could be chosen as the Danish submission for the Best Foreign Language Film at the 89th Academy Awards, but it was not selected.

Cast
 Mikkel Boe Følsgaard as Thomas
 Cecilie Lassen as Sofie
 Karen-Lise Mynster as Ruth
 Silja Eriksen Jensen as Nina
 Morten Holst as Jimmy
 Dar Salim as Sami, Doctor

References

External links
 

2016 films
2016 drama films
Danish drama films
2010s Danish-language films
Films directed by Lisa Ohlin